The Monticello Railway Museum (initialized MRYM, reporting mark MRMZ) is a non-profit railroad museum located in Monticello, Illinois, about 18 miles west of Champaign, IL. It is home to over 100 pieces of railroad equipment, including several restored diesel locomotives and cars.

Overview 

The museum offers a tourist railroad which operates excursion trains over a former railroad line that was owned by Illinois Terminal and Illinois Central Gulf. For a donation, guests can operate one of the locomotives during the "Throttle Time" program. Trains run May through October and on holidays.

The Camp Creek yard was originally built by the museum's volunteers.  The Terminal Division is a re-built Illinois Terminal right-of-way running from Camp Creek up to Blacker's towards White Heath.  The Central Division was purchased by the museum from the Illinois Central.  The Central Division purchase allowed the museum to enter into downtown Monticello to the historic Wabash Railroad depot and is the mainline of the museum's heritage railroad. The Central Division is currently being restored up to White Heath to allow occasional operation into that town.  Only a short section of the Terminal Division is currently in use from the central switch down past Nelson's Crossing depot into Camp Creek yard, but has been restored to within a few miles of White Heath.

Location 
The Monticello Railway Museum is located off Interstate 72 at Market St. Exit 166.  Turn at the stoplight onto Iron Horse Place at the Best Western Gateway Inn, and follow the frontage road to the end.  25 minutes from Champaign and Decatur.  50 minutes from Bloomington.

History 
The Monticello Railway Museum, a not-for-profit educational organization, was founded in 1966 as "SPUR, Inc" (Society for the Perpetuation of Unretired Railfans, Inc). Its original goal was to encourage the Chicago, Burlington & Quincy Railroad to continue operating its steam-powered railfan excursions.  When that effort failed, the organization decided to operate its own steam-powered excursions and began a search for equipment and a suitable location.  SPUR contacted the Illinois Central Railroad about operating on the West end of ICRR's lightly used Rantoul District between LeRoy and Sabina, Illinois.  For such an operation, ICRR would require SPUR's equipment to be in "ICC condition" and use the railroad's union train crews.  SPUR concluded this would be prohibitively expensive for the organization and continued its search.  In 1966, SPUR was invited to Monticello, Illinois by a member of the Illinois Pioneer Heritage Center and moved its first piece of equipment, locomotive #1, a 1925 Alco 0-4-0T, to a vacant lot near the Heritage Center in Monticello.  The organization's name was changed in 1970 to the Monticello & Sangamon Valley Railway Historical Society, Inc., and then shortened in 1982 to the present day Monticello Railway Museum.

The first land purchased was about five miles (8 km) of former Illinois Terminal interurban right of way between Monticello and White Heath. This right of way had been abandoned a few years before and the grade had only ballast in place. A former popcorn field was purchased for a railroad yard and maintenance area. The volunteers prepared the yard area for the arrival of locomotive #1 and moved it from the Heritage Center's lot in Monticello. Through the years track was laid on the former Illinois Terminal interurban grade toward White Heath until approximately 2½ miles was completed. A run-around was constructed at (Blacker's), about 2 miles from White Heath.  No further construction took place on the former interurban grade and Blacker's became the North end of the line.  In 1988, after the purchase of some of the adjacent Illinois Central Gulf's Decatur District, the portion of the Museum's trackage built on the former Illinois Terminal interurban grade was designated the "Terminal Division."

In 1987, the Museum purchased 7 ½ miles of Illinois Central Gulf Decatur District trackage between Monticello and White Heath which parallels the Illinois Terminal right-of-way. The Nelson Crossing display track lead was extended to a new connecting turnout in the former ICG trackage, joining the Museum's track with the newly purchased line.  The connection was built by Museum volunteers in just two weekends.  After a short "Golden Spike" ceremony, the Museum's first run into Monticello was made.  The former Illinois Central Gulf trackage to Monticello and White Heath was designated the Museum's "Central Division."

Today the train ride primarily traverses the Central Division, using the Terminal Division only when pulling into the depot at Nelson's Crossing. The station names used on both the Central and Terminal Divisions were used by the original railroads.

Equipment

Locomotives 

 Southern Railway 2-8-0 Consolidation #401 built in 1907 by the Baldwin Locomotive Works. It is now operational after 15 years of restoration.  #401 arrived at the museum in 1971 from Margerum, Alabama, which is located in Colbert County.
 Wabash Railroad F7A #1189 was the last F7A ordered by the Wabash and was the last F7A model locomotive built by General Motor Division, Ltd. at London, Ontario, Canada. Retired in September 1979, and in January 1980, was sent to Decatur, Illinois, to be scrapped. Norfolk & Western Railroad donated it to the museum in 1982. After being restored by the museum, it was dedicated on August 15, 1992. In 2014, Norfolk Southern Corporation most generously agreed to rebuild both trucks and to replace the main generator. To facilitate this work, the locomotive was moved to the NS Juniata Diesel shop, returning to Monticello in October 2014.
 Canadian National FPA4 #6789 was built in 1959 by the Montreal Locomotive Works.  It was retired in 1989 and acquired in 1994 by its private owner.
 Milwaukee Road NW2 #1649 was built in 1947 by the Electro-Motive Division of General Motors.  This unit arrived at the museum in 2000 and restoration was completed in late 2003.
 Illinois Central GP11 #8733 was built by the Electro-Motive Division in 1958 as a GP9.  It was in the last order of GP-9's purchased new by the IC.  Its original number was 9386 and was rebuilt in 1980 as a GP11, at the Paducah Shops in Kentucky.  The locomotive was donated by Canadian National-Illinois Central in 2001.  This unit has been restored to an operational condition.
 Illinois Central SD40 #6071 was built by the Electro-Motive Division in July 1964. It was constructed on an SD39 frame, and was the first SD40 ever manufactured. It was donated to the museum by Canadian National in July 2009. The locomotive was upgraded to an SD40-2R.
 Long Island Rail Road RS-3 #1559 was built in 1955 by the American Locomotive Works (ALCO).  The Gettysburg Railroad purchased it, renumbered it #301, and later sold it to the Maryland Midland Railroad.  It is currently painted in Illinois Central Railroad livery as #704 for the 150th anniversary for that railroad.
 Lincoln Sand & Gravel #44 was donated in 1975.  Built in 1940 for Morrell Meatpacking, this was one of seven 44 tonners of this style built by The Davenport Locomotive Co.  This engine saw use at the museum from the mid-1970s until the late 1980s and early 1990s.  #44 is currently on display at the museum.
 Pennsylvania Railroad E8A #5764 was built in 1952 by Electro-Motive Division.  This unit was the last passenger engine built for the Pennsy.  Other numbers for this engine were PC 4264, MBTA 4264 and BDT 5764.  It was last used by the Tennessee Central Railroad from whom its private owner purchased it.  The locomotive is current being restored and when completed will emerge as Illinois Central #4044 to go with the museum's replica Illinois Central streamline passenger train.
 Engine #1 was the Museum's first piece of equipment and was acquired in 1966 from the Western Indiana Aggregate & Stone in Montezuma, Indiana. Built in 1925 by American Locomotive Works (ALCo) and weighing 27½ tons, this 0-4-0 came with a saddle tank. It was trucked to Monticello where restoration work began in a parking lot. The tank was removed and tender #X4342 was donated by the Illinois Central to use with the engine. The locomotive was last used at the museum in 1988 and has been cosmetically restored and placed on display at the entrance to Iron Horse Place. It is the subject of an excellent documentary, "Running a Steam Locomotive" (see the See Also section below).
 Engine #191, built by the American Locomotive Works (Alco) in 1916. was used at Republic Steel of Massillon, Ohio.  This 85 ton 0-6-0 with 51" drivers was purchased and arrived at the Museum from Columbus, Ohio in 1972.  The first operation of this engine was in on October 9, 1972, and the last was in 1986.
 Mississippi Eastern Railway 4-6-0 #303 was built in 1916 by the Baldwin Locomotive Works.  It was donated to the museum and arrived in 2000.
 Canadian National FPB4 #6862 was built in 1958 by the Montreal Locomotive Works.  It was retired in 1989 and was acquired by its private owner in 1995.
 Illinois & Midland Railroad EMD RS1325 #31 was built in 1960 by Electro-Motive Division. It was one of only two RS1325's ever built. It was retired in 2020 and was bought by the museum shortly after. It arrived at the museum on the 17th of November in 2020.
 Illinois Terminal Railroad EMD SW1200 #784 was built in 1955 by Electro-Motive Division. It was retired in 1994 and sold to the Sequatchie Valley Railroad, and was later acquired by Knoxville Locomotive Works in Knoxville, Tennessee. The museum bought the locomotive in 2020, and arrived in Monticello on the 12th of February in 2021.

Notable rolling stock 

 Illinois Central #892 is a combine passenger/baggage car built in 1918 by the Pullman Company for the IC.  American Steel Foundries converted it to brake testing car #1948 and equipped it with instrumentation for various tests on railroad hardware manufactured by ACF.  The floor section over both trucks had glass inserted to allow for viewing during the tests.  The baggage portion of the car retained its glass floor during restoration at the museum. This car was donated by ACF in 1976.
 Rock Island #2541 was built by the Pullman Company in 1925 for the Chicago, Rock Island & Pacific Railroad.  It was used in Chicago commuter service until the mid-1970s.
 Illinois Central #7 was built in 1917 by the Pullman Company as an office-observation car for the Illinois Central Railroad.
 Illinois Central #3531 was built in 1950 for the Nickel Plate Road which named it the "City of Findlay" and numbered it #210.  It is a 10-roomette/6-bedroom sleeping car.  It was purchased by the Illinois Central in 1965, rebuilt with smooth sides, was renumbered #3531 and named "Council Bluffs".  This car was painted in 2007 and is on display.
 Nautilus II aquarium car was rebuilt in 1957 from the Chicago & Eastern Illinois Railroad lunch-counter car, "Turkey Run"  The car was used by the John G. Shedd Aquarium of Chicago to transport marine specimens until 1972.  The 16 portable 190 gallon Cyprus holding tanks, combined with 20 welded-steel tanks, could hold up to 3,000 specimens.  The tanks were loaded onto a barge and the collections were made from the Atlantic Ocean, Gulf of Mexico, and the Pacific Ocean.  The car was donated in 1974.
 Delaware & Hudson baggage car #405 was built for that railroad and sold to the former Gulf, Mobile and Ohio Railroad when it became #457.  It was acquired by the museum in 1995 from the Illinois Central Railroad.
 Pleasant Valley sleeper was built in 1942 by the Pullman Company for the Atchison, Topeka and Santa Fe Railway.  It was to be used for a joint venture between the New York Central and the Santa Fe Railroads.  As it was built during World War II, it has Masonite interior walls rather than steel.  This car is a 6-6-4 sleeper meaning it has six open sections, six roomettes and four bedrooms.
 Illinois Central #3312 "Gulfport" was built in 1942 as part of the first light-weight Panama Limited train set.  The "Gulfport" is a sleeper, observation, and lounge car.  It was one of only two built from Pullman Lot 6672, plan 4201. Its sister car, the Memphis, was destroyed by a derailment in 1965. The Gulfport was sold by the Illinois Central in 1968 to Bobbie Thompson Farms near Thornton, Mississippi.  It saw service as a hunting cabin until 2005, when the car was donated to the Museum.  When sold by the Illinois Central, the trucks were retained by the IC. New trucks have been acquired and several members made a trip to Mississippi in August 2005 to prepare the car for over-the-road travel.  Initial inspection of the car shows that there is a lot of work ahead to see this car back in service.  Although largely intact, time has not been kind.  Mechanical systems will have to be replaced, the roof repaired, and the vestibule and side sills rebuilt.  The car was trucked to Monticello in July 2006, placed on its new trucks, and delivered to the museum.
 Illinois Central coach #2612 "Carondelet" was built by the Pullman Company in 1947.  It was purchased in 1995 and restoration was completed in 2000.
 Illinois Central coach #2920 was built in 1925 by the Pullman Company.
 Illinois Central Diner #4112 Restoration completed in 2015. Unique L-Shaped booths at the end of this car. Kitchen is fully operational including presto-log burning stove.
 Illinois Central diner #4110 "Shadrach Bond" was built in 1946 by the Pullman Company for the Green Diamond. It was retired in 1971 due to safety violations in the kitchen. Later that year, it was purchased by the Pacific Railroad Society in San Dimas, California. It was later donated to the Monticello museum in 2015 along with Gulf, Mobile, and Ohio Railroad sleeper car #9012. Restoration was later completed by the museum.
Gulf, Mobile, and Ohio Railroad sleeper #9012 "Timothy B. Blackstone" was built by American Car and Foundry Company in 1950. It was named after Timothy Blackstone, a former president of the GM&O. It was later acquired by the Pacific Railroad Society, and donated to the Monticello museum in 2015.

Structures 
Nelson's Crossing Depot was donated in 1977.  This Illinois Central Railroad depot was formerly located in Deland, Illinois.  The depot was built in 1919 and rebuilt in 1942.  The depot was moved to the museum in 1980 and is the ticket office and gift shop of the museum.

The Wabash Depot was built in 1899 to replace a smaller depot, burned earlier that year.  At the time the Wabash mainline went through Monticello between what is now the grain elevator and McDonald's.  The line was moved west onto a fill, straightened, and a new steel bridge was built over what was the Illinois Central Railroad (now Monticello Railway Museum trackage).  On April 20, 1904, the depot was moved to higher ground beside the new mainline.  The depot was moved to its present location on May 29, 1987, and was restored by the Monticello Depot Association.  January 1. 1993, that organization, its members and assets were absorbed into the Monticello Railway Museum.

Special events

Railroad Days 

Among the special events at the museum, there is Railroad Days held each year the third weekend of September.  One ticket per day allows riders to experience the ultimate railroad experience in the Midwest.  A regular passenger train using former Illinois Central coaches and office car #7, a mixed-freight train, plus motor cars going into White Heath.

Fireworks Special 

A fireworks special train leaves at 8.00pm and travels north to the museum grounds to set and watch fireworks. Air conditioned coaches and open air car, and open window coaches along with two locomotives are used.

See also 

 List of United States railroads
 List of Illinois railroads
 List of heritage railroads in the United States
 List of railway museums
 This 1980 documentary film of Engine #1 was shot at this location. It provides an excellent overview of steam engine physics and nomenclature, and how to operate one.

Notes

References

External links 

 

1966 establishments in Illinois
Heritage railroads in Illinois
Illinois railroads
Museums established in 1966
Museums in Piatt County, Illinois
Railroad museums in Illinois